Cyphosperma voutmelensis is a species of flowering plant in the family Arecaceae. It is found only in Vanuatu. It is threatened by habitat loss.

References

voutmelensis
Trees of Vanuatu
Endangered plants
Endemic flora of Vanuatu
Taxonomy articles created by Polbot
Taxa named by John Leslie Dowe
Taxobox binomials not recognized by IUCN